Kazanka (Qazansu) is a river in the Russian Federation, a left tributary of the Volga. The Kazanka begins near the village of Bimeri in Arsk District and flows into the Kuybyshev Reservoir in Kazan, near the Kazan Kremlin. Other towns on the Kazanka are Arsk and historical Iske Kazan. The main tributaries are the Iya, Kismes, Shimyakovka and Sula. Historically, the Bulak river flowed into Kazanka until it was separated by a dam in 1957.

During the construction of the Samara Reservoir, a lower part of the Kazanka valley was flooded. A part of the riverbed was separated from the reservoir by dams, creating a new riverbed. In 2008 a project was proposed to fill in a cove in the wide section of the estuary for a business district.

The Kazanka divides the city of Kazan into two equal parts. Six bridges within the city cross the Kazanka; the most notable among them is the Millennium Bridge.

References

See also

 Kazanka (boat)
 Bulak

Rivers of Tatarstan